Joy Nakhumicha Sakari (born 6 June 1986 in Chepkoya, Kenya) is a Kenyan sprinter who specializes in the 400 metres. She represented Kenya at the 2012 Summer Olympics.

One day after improving the Kenyan record at the 2015 World Championships, she failed a doping test.

References 

1986 births
Living people
Kenyan female sprinters
Athletes (track and field) at the 2012 Summer Olympics
Olympic athletes of Kenya
World Athletics Championships athletes for Kenya
Doping cases in athletics
Kenyan sportspeople in doping cases
Olympic female sprinters